Breeda Wool is an American actress, writer and producer. She is best known for her roles as Lou Linklatter in the Audience crime drama series Mr. Mercedes (2017–2019) and Faith Deluth in the Lifetime/Hulu drama series UnREAL (2015–2018).

Her major film credits include AWOL (2016), XX (2017), Automatic at Sea (2016), Erasing Eden (2016) and Craters of the Moon (2013).

Wool also appeared as Victoria in the Amazon digital series Betas (2013). She made guest appearances in Freeform's Famous in Love (2017–2018), NBC's Midnight, Texas (2017–2018), Law & Order: Special Victims Unit, two episodes of Law & Order: Criminal Intent (2001–2011), the two-hour series finale of CSI: Crime Scene Investigation (2000–2015), and HBO's Room 104 (2020).

Early life 
Wool was born and raised in Urbana, Illinois. Wool knew that she wanted to be a performer at a young age. She starred in numerous theatrical productions throughout her elementary and high school career, before her talent landed her a musical theater scholarship to Wagner College. While there, she transitioned from theater to short films, starring in the Columbia University graduate short, Dandelion Fall. Her desire to pursue acting after college took her to New York City, where she spent ten years performing in theater, reciting Shakespeare, sketch comedy, and avant-garde movement dance before relocating to Los Angeles. Since making the move, she has continued to nurture her craft by taking a weekly class at the Imagined Life Theater.

Wool's late father was a "wild, Irish guitar-playing scientist" and her mother, whom she greatly admires, is a "California, artist beach-babe" who studied in Ireland where they met. They were both college professors.

Education 
Wool graduated in 2004 from Wagner College, where she triple-majored in Psychology, Theater and Philosophy. Wool studied acting at the Imagined Life Theater from 2010 to 2013.

Career 
In 2010, Wool began performing with the Upright Citizens Brigade improv sketch comedy troupe. In 2010, Wool starred in the critically acclaimed short film AWOL, which received recognition from the Sundance Women in Film Panel and the Gotham Independent Film Awards before being adapted as a feature-length film in 2016. She was awarded Best Shorts Actress in 2013 by the Woods Hole Film Festival for her role in the short film Lambing Season.

She appeared in various other short films, including The Slows (2018), Rflktr (2018), Midnight Confession (2017), The Boy Who Cried Fish! (2016), and Dandelion Fall (2007), amongst others.

She was featured in Metallica's music video for "Confusion". Wool has appeared on various television programs, including The Affair (2018), Famous in Love (2017), Vice Principals (2017), Midnight, Texas (2017), Strangers (2017), CSI: Crime Scene Investigation (2015), Weeds (2010), Law & Order: Special Victims Unit (2010), and Law & Order: Criminal Intent (2007, 2009).

Wool was an executive producer and co-writer for the feature film Mother's Little Helpers. She also was a producer for Rflktr (2018) and Miss Miao (2014), as well as a writer for the short film Shelton's Oasis (2013).

In 2013, Wool was cast as Victoria in Amazon's web series Betas.

In 2015, Wool appeared in the first season of UnREAL as Faith, a closeted Christian lesbian. She reprised her role as Faith in a 2017 web series spin off, The Faith Diaries, and returned to UnREAL in the fourth season.

In 2017, Wool was cast as a series regular in the Audience crime drama Mr. Mercedes, a series based on the Stephen King's Bill Hodges trilogy. Mr. Mercedes was renewed for a third season on the Audience network.

Personal life 
Wool practices Yoga, plays volleyball, draws, and takes piano lessons. Wool favors vegetarian food.

Wool lives in Los Angeles, California with her partner Matt Friedman. Friedman, a music producer and musician, is an outspoken feminist. They have a daughter born in June 2020.

Filmography

Film

Television

Music videos

Producer

Writer

Accolades

References

External links

American film actresses
American writers
American producers
Living people
American television actresses
21st-century American actresses
1982 births